The Gimpo Goldline ( or ) is a light metro line opened on 28 September 2019.

Background
Under the third mayor of Gimpo City, Kim Dongsik (김동식), the line was going to be an extension of Line 5. This idea was rejected by Seoul Metropolitan Rapid Transit Corporation (now Seoul Metro) as they wanted to build a subway yard in the town of Yangchon-eup.

Since then, the Gimpo Han River Metro project was promoted under the mayor of Kang Kyung-gu, but the plan was canceled and Seoul Subway Line 9 extended to Gimpo but failed after Yoo Young-rok, a Democrat who was at a political crossroads with Kim Dong-sik and Kang Kyung-gu's Grand National Party, was elected. The opening of the metro has been delayed several times under the current mayor, Yoo Young-rok and Chung ha-yeong, and it has been criticized by citizens.

The construction cost was 1.6503 trillion won with 1.2 trillion from Korea Land and Housing Corporation. And this funds came from the wide-area transportation contributions paid to the company by residents of the Hangang New Town. Two car vehicles operates at intervals of three minutes during peak hours with a maximum occupancy of 122 people per car. The line uses rolling stock by Hyundai Rotem. Travel time from one end to the other is an estimated 30 minutes and transfers are available at Gimpo Airport Station. In 2012, planners expected 88,257 passengers during the first year of operation (then 2018), 91,501 in 2021, and 92,561 in 2026 with an operating deficit of roughly 10 billion won.

Stations

References

Seoul Metropolitan Subway lines
Gimpo
Railway lines opened in 2019
Airport rail links in South Korea

750 V DC railway electrification